The Passion is a 1987 novel by British novelist Jeanette Winterson. The novel depicts a young French soldier in the Napoleonic army during 1805 as he takes charge of Napoleon's personal larder. The novel won the John Llewellyn Rhys Prize. Publication and subsequent sales of the novel allowed Winterson to stop working other jobs, and support herself as a full-time writer.

Though nominally a historical novel, Winterson takes considerable liberties with the depiction of the historical setting and various strategies for interpreting the historical—making the novel historiographic metafiction. The novel also explores themes like passion, constructions of gender and sexuality, and broader themes common to 1980s and 90s British fiction. Parts of the novel are set in Venice—Winterson had yet to visit the city when she wrote about it, instead the depiction was entirely fictional.

Reception 
Kirkus Reviews described the novel as " fascinating" and demonstrating "considerable powers" comparing the novel to the works of Robertson Davies.

On 5 November 2019, BBC News listed The Passion on its list of the 100 'most inspiring' novels.

References 

Novels by Jeanette Winterson
1987 British novels
Historical novels
Postmodern novels
Fiction set in 1805
Novels set during the Napoleonic Wars
Novels set in Venice
Bloomsbury Publishing books
1980s LGBT novels